A referendum on financial issues was held in Puerto Rico on 10 December 1961. The referendum was approved by 82.8% of voters.

In 1961 the United States Congress adopted a joint resolution amending article three of the Puerto Rico Federal Relations Act, providing that said resolution take effect upon approval by a majority of the Puerto Rican electorate in a referendum amending the Constitution of Puerto Rico. The Legislative Assembly of Puerto Rico accordingly approved a joint resolution on September 29, 1961, providing for the holding of said referendum, which in turn passed by majority of the popular vote on December 10, 1961. This referendum added some provisions to the Constitution of Puerto Rico and substituted the wording in the Puerto Rico Federal Relations Act that limited Puerto Rico's debt-incurring powers. This amendment added the full faith and credit pledge wording to the public debt provisions in the Constitution of Puerto Rico, which were not in its original language of 1952.

Results

References

1961 referendums
1961
1961 in Puerto Rico
December 1961 events in North America